Albert Ernest Alexander (5 January 1914 – 23 May 1970) was a British-Australian chemist known for his pioneering work with colloids.

References

Australian chemists
Fellows of the Australian Academy of Science
1914 births
1970 deaths
Colloid chemists
British emigrants to Australia